Chidera Kennedy Ezeh (born 2 October 1997) is a Nigerian football player who plays in Portugal for the Under-23 squad of Portimonense.

Club career
He made his professional debut in the Segunda Liga for Portimonense on 20 November 2016 in a game against Braga B.

International
He won the 2013 FIFA U-17 World Cup with Nigeria, scoring a goal in the semi-final game against Sweden.

References

1997 births
Sportspeople from Lagos
Living people
Nigerian footballers
Nigerian expatriate footballers
Expatriate footballers in Portugal
Portimonense S.C. players
Liga Portugal 2 players
Nigeria youth international footballers
Association football forwards
21st-century Nigerian people